The 1993–94 Czech Cup was the first season of the annual football knock-out tournament of the Czech Republic. Winners Viktoria Žižkov qualified for the 1994–95 UEFA Cup Winners' Cup.

Preliminary round

Round 1

Round 2

Round 3

Round 4
Fourth round matches were played on 6 October 1993, except the Ústí nad Labem versus Sparta Prague match, which was played on 31 March 1994.

|}

Quarterfinals
The quarterfinals were played on 27 April 1994.

|}

Semifinals
The semifinals were played on 11 May 1994.

|}

Final

See also
 1993–94 Czech First League
 1993–94 Czech 2. Liga

References

External links
 Official site 
 Czech Cup 1993/94 at RSSSF.com

1993–94
1993–94 domestic association football cups
Cup